Coronaviruses are a group of viruses that cause diseases in mammals and birds.

Coronavirus may also refer to:
 Severe acute respiratory syndrome coronavirus 2 (SARS-CoV-2), a strain that emerged in 2019
 Coronavirus disease 2019 (COVID-19), the disease it causes
 COVID-19 pandemic, the global spread of that disease

See also
 SARS, a disease caused by the coronavirus strain SARS-CoV
 MERS, a disease caused by the coronavirus strain MERS-CoV
 Upper respiratory tract infection or the common cold, which may be caused by several different coronaviruses